Tamazulita is a town in the Mexican state of Jalisco. It is part of the Tecolotlan municipality.

References

External links 
Photo, mi verde tamazulita

Populated places in Jalisco